S is the nineteenth letter of the English alphabet.

S may also refer to:

History
 an Anglo-Saxon charter's number in Peter Sawyer's, catalogue

Language and linguistics 
 Long s (ſ), a form of the lower-case letter s formerly used where "s" occurred in the middle or at the beginning of a word
 -s, a suffix added to some English surnames, originally meaning "son of"
 , the International Phonetic Alphabet symbol for a voiceless alveolar sibilant sound
 S, the subject of an intransitive verb

Mathematics and logic 
 Integral symbol (∫), used in mathematics to denote integrals and antiderivatives
 S combinator in combinatory logic
 Sphere
 s(n), the aliquot sum of an integer n

Physics and chemistry 
 Sulfur, symbol S, a chemical element
 s, for second, the SI unit of time
 S, the symbol for entropy
 S, a non-SI unit used to designate molecule size named after the Svedberg sedimentation coefficient   
 S, a label that denotes one of two chiral center configurations in the R/S system
 s, one of the Mandelstam variables, the square of the invariant mass
 Siemens (unit), the SI derived unit of electric conductance
 S-block of the periodic table, which includes alkali metals, alkaline earth metals, and hydrogen and helium
 Spin (physics)
 s, an abbreviation for solid

Biology and medicine 
 Serine, a standard amino acid abbreviated as Ser or S
 ATC code S Sensory organs, a section of the Anatomical Therapeutic Chemical Classification System
 S phase or synthesis phase, a period in the cell cycle during interphase

Computing
 Samsung Galaxy S (2010 smartphone), the first flagship smartphone of the Samsung Galaxy S series
 S (programming language), an environment for statistical computing and graphics
 <s>, the opening tag for the HTML element denoting information that is "no longer accurate or no longer relevant", usually rendered as strike-through text

People
 S, the pen name of Percy Bysshe Shelley
 "S.", the nickname for Solomon Shereshevsky (1886-1958), a Russian journalist, mnemonist, and synesthete notable for his unusual memory abilities

Arts and entertainment

Books
 S. (Dorst novel), written by Doug Dorst based on story by J.J. Abrams
 S. (Updike novel), part of the Scarlet Letter trilogy by John Updike
 S (novel series), a 2005-2006 light novel series
 "S" Is for Silence, the nineteenth novel in Sue Grafton's "Alphabet mystery" series, published in 2005

Music
 S, the stage name of singer-songwriter and guitarist Jenn Champion
 S (group), a short-lived South Korean music group active in 2003 and 2014
 S (EP), a 2001 EP by Japanese musical duo NaNa
 Numbering of Franz Liszt's works according to Humphrey Searle's catalogue

Television
S, the production code for the 1965 Doctor Who serial The Time Meddler

Comics
 S, the protagonist of Heavy Liquid

Automobiles

Production models
 Aion S, a Chinese electric compact executive sedan
 Jaguar S-Type (1963), a British sports saloon
 Jaguar S-Type (1999), a British executive saloon
 Mercedes-Benz S-Class, a German full-size luxury car series
 Mini Cooper S, a British hot hatch
 Neta S, a Chinese electric sedan
 Tesla Model S, an American electric executive sedan

Prototypes and concepts
 Sony Vision-S, Japanese mid-size electric concept sedan

Series and trims
 Acura Type-S, a range of Japanese performance vehicles
 Audi S, a range of German performance vehicles
 Honda S series, series of Japanese sports cars
 Jaguar S, a range of British performance vehicles

Other uses
 Safety (gridiron football position)
 South on a map or compass, one of the four cardinal directions
 s, the SI symbol for second
 Shilling (British coin)
 Old Israeli Shekel, denominated as S
 S postcode area, a postcode area including Sheffield, England
 A party label for the Swedish Social Democratic Party
 Strike (baseball)
 S band, a band of radio which ranges from 2 to 4 GHz
 Sierra, the military time zone code for UTC−06:00
 Cool S, a graffiti sign

See also
 's (disambiguation)
 -s (disambiguation)
 S class (disambiguation)
 S Curve (disambiguation)
 Split S